Adventures of the Penguin King is a British 2013 natural history documentary which follows the life of a male king penguin on South Georgia. Released in 3D and 2D, the film uses some of the same footage as Penguins 3D.

It was released as on Blu-ray and Blu-ray 3D by Cinedigm in 2014.

References

External links
 

Documentary films about birds
Fauna of South Georgia
2013 films
Films about penguins
2013 documentary films
3D documentary films
2013 3D films
British 3D films
British documentary films
2010s English-language films
2010s British films
Documentary films about Antarctica